1936 in the Philippines details events of note that happened in the Philippines in the year 1936.

Incumbents

President: Manuel L. Quezon (Nacionalista Party)
Vice President: Sergio Osmeña (Nacionalista Party)
Chief Justice: Ramón Avanceña
 Philippine National Assembly: 1st National Assembly of the Philippines

Events

March
 March 25 – President Manuel L. Quezon issues Executive Order No. 23 which provided for the technical description and specifications of the Philippine national flag.

August
 August 1-16 – The Philippines competed at the 1936 Summer Olympics in Berlin, Germany. 28 competitors, all men, take part in 20 events in 6 sports.

Holidays

As per Act No. 2711 section 29, issued on March 10, 1917, any legal holiday of fixed date falls on Sunday, the next succeeding day shall be observed as legal holiday. Sundays are also considered legal religious holidays. Bonifacio Day was added through Philippine Legislature Act No. 2946. It was signed by then-Governor General Francis Burton Harrison in 1921. On October 28, 1931, the Act No. 3827 was approved declaring the last Sunday of August as National Heroes Day.

 January 1 – New Year's Day
 February 22 – Legal Holiday
 April 9 – Maundy Thursday
 April 10 – Good Friday
 May 1 – Labor Day
 July 4 – Philippine Republic Day
 August 13  – Legal Holiday
 August 30 – National Heroes Day
 November 26 – Thanksgiving Day
 November 30 – Bonifacio Day
 December 25 – Christmas Day
 December 30 – Rizal Day

Births
January 6 - Nida Blanca, Filipina actress (d. 2001)
January 14 - Abdulmari Imao, National Artist of the Philippines for Sculpture. (d. 2014)
April 3 - Louie Beltran, Filipino columnist (d. 1994)
April 6 – Boy Asistio, former mayor of Caloocan (d. 2017)
July 18 - Kurt Bachmann, Olympic basketball player (d. 2014)
October 2 - Feliciano Belmonte, Jr., member of the Philippine House of Representatives
December 26 - Jose de Venecia, Jr., Filipino businessman and Former Speaker of the House of Representatives of the Philippines

References